Stegastes sanctipauli is a species of fish in the family Pomacentridae. It is endemic to Brazil, where it occurs only around St Paul's Rocks.

References

Sources

Fauna of Brazil
sanctipauli
Endemic fauna of Brazil
Fish described in 1987
Taxonomy articles created by Polbot